Payetakht (meaning "capital city"), also Romanized as Paytakht, Pa-ye Takht, or Pa yi Takht, may refer to:
 Payetakht, Kerman
 Payetakht-e Golzar
 Payetakht-e Talkor
 Paytakht (TV series), Iranian TV show

See also
 Pa Takht (disambiguation)